Junayd or Junaid or  Junayed and sometimes Jounaid is a male given name which means soldier or warrior.

Persons with the given name

Junaid
Junaid Akbar (born 1975), Pakistani politician
Junaid of Babunagar (1953-2021), Bangladeshi Islamic scholar
Junaid Ismail Dockrat, South African Dentist
Junaid Hartley (born 1978), South African footballer
Junaid Jamshed (1964–2016), Pakistani singer
Khawaja Junaid (born 1966), Pakistani field hockey player
Junaid Khan (cricketer) (born 1989), Pakistani cricketer
Junaid Khan (singer) (born 1981), Pakistani singer-songwriter
Junaid Siddique (born 1987), Bangladeshi cricketer
Junaid Siddiqui (born 1985), Pakistani-Canadian cricketer
Junaid Thorne, Australian Islamic preacher
Junaid Zia (born 1983), Pakistani cricketer

Zunaid
Zunaid Ahmed Palak (born 1980), Bangladeshi politician

Junayd
Junayd of Baghdad (830–910), Persian Sufi
Junayd (illustrator) (circa 1396, Baghdad)
Junayd of Gujarat, Indian Sufi
Junayd of Shiraz (fl. 1389), Persian Sufi
Junayd of Aydın (died 1425), nobleman and warrior in Anatolia
Shaykh Junayd (died 1460), the Sheikh of Safaviya

Persons with the middle name
Mohammed Junaid Babar (born c. 1975), Pakistani-American terrorist

Persons with the surname

Junaid
Bushra Junaid, Canadian artist, curator and arts administrator 
Junaid Muhammad Junaid (born 1955), Yemeni poet
Masooma Junaid, (born 1989), Pakistani cricketer
Muctar Yunos Junaid, Filipino politician
Rameez Junaid (born 1981), Australian tennis player

Juned
Abdul Aziz Juned, Grand Mufti of Brunei

See also
Cüneyt, Turkish form of the name
Ismail and Junaid, Pakistani musical band 
Loon (rapper), adopted the name Amir Junaid Muhadith after converting to Islam

Arabic masculine given names
Pakistani masculine given names